Helga Offen (3 October 1951 – 25 July 2020) was a German volleyball player. She competed for East Germany in the women's tournament at the 1976 Summer Olympics.

References

External links
 

1951 births
2020 deaths
German women's volleyball players
Olympic volleyball players of East Germany
Volleyball players at the 1976 Summer Olympics
Sportspeople from Schwerin